Zoltán Dömötör (21 August 1935 – 20 November 2019)  was a Hungarian swimmer and water polo player who competed in the 1960 Summer Olympics, in the 1964 Summer Olympics, and in the 1968 Summer Olympics.

He was born in Budapest.

Dömötör was part of the Hungarian water polo team which won the bronze medal in the 1960 tournament. He played six matches and scored nine goals.

Four years later he was a member of the Hungarian team which won the gold medal in the 1964 Olympic tournament. He played all six matches and scored seven goals.

At the 1968 Games he won his second bronze medal with the Hungarian team. He played all eight matches and scored two goals.

See also
 Hungary men's Olympic water polo team records and statistics
 List of Olympic champions in men's water polo
 List of Olympic medalists in water polo (men)

References

External links
 

1935 births
2019 deaths
Hungarian male water polo players
Olympic water polo players of Hungary
Water polo players at the 1960 Summer Olympics
Water polo players at the 1964 Summer Olympics
Water polo players at the 1968 Summer Olympics
Olympic gold medalists for Hungary
Olympic bronze medalists for Hungary
Olympic medalists in water polo
European Aquatics Championships medalists in swimming
Medalists at the 1968 Summer Olympics
Medalists at the 1964 Summer Olympics
Medalists at the 1960 Summer Olympics
Water polo players from Budapest

Hungarian male swimmers
20th-century Hungarian people
21st-century Hungarian people